Model order reduction (MOR) is a technique for reducing the computational complexity of mathematical models in numerical simulations. As such it is closely related to the concept of metamodeling, with applications in all areas of mathematical modelling.

Overview 
Many modern mathematical models of real-life processes pose challenges when used in numerical simulations, due to complexity and large size (dimension). Model order reduction aims to lower the computational complexity of such problems, for example, in simulations of large-scale dynamical systems and control systems. By a reduction of the model's associated state space dimension or degrees of freedom, an approximation to the original model is computed which is commonly referred to as a reduced order model.

Reduced order models are useful in settings where it is often unfeasible to perform numerical simulations using the complete full order model.  This can be due to limitations in computational resources or the requirements of the simulations setting, for instance real-time simulation settings or many-query settings in which a large number of simulations needs to be performed. Examples of Real-time simulation settings include control systems in electronics and visualization of model results while examples for a many-query setting can include optimization problems and design exploration. In order to be applicable to real-world problems, often the requirements of a reduced order model are:
 A small approximation error compared to the full order model.
 Conservation of the properties and characteristics of the full order model (E.g. stability and passivity in electronics).
 Computationally efficient and robust reduced order modelling techniques.
It is interesting to note that in some cases (e.g. constrained lumping of polynomial differential equations) it is possible to have a null approximation error, resulting in an exact model order reduction.

Methods 

Contemporary model order reduction techniques can be broadly classified into 5 classes:

 Proper orthogonal decomposition methods.
 Reduced basis methods.
 Balancing methods
 Simplified physics or operational based reduction methods.
 Nonlinear manifold methods.

The simplified physics approach can be described to be analogous to the traditional mathematical modelling approach, in which a less complex description of a system is constructed based on assumptions and simplifications using physical insight or otherwise derived information. However, this approach is not often the topic of discussion in the context of model order reduction as it is a general method in science, engineering, and mathematics.

The remaining listed methods fall into the category of projection-based reduction. Projection-based reduction relies on the projection of either the model equations or the solution onto a basis of reduced dimensionality compared to the original solution space. Methods that also fall into this class but are perhaps less common are:

 Proper generalized decomposition
 Matrix interpolation
 Transfer function interpolation
 Piecewise tangential interpolation
 Loewner framework
 (Empirical) cross Gramian
 Krylov subspace methods

Implementations 

 RBmatlab: A MATLAB library containing all reduced simulation approaches for linear and nonlinear, affine or arbitrarily parameter dependent evolution problems with finite element, finite volume or local discontinuous Galerkin discretizations. Further information can be found on the download and documentation page. 

 pyMOR: pyMOR is a software library for building model order reduction applications with the Python programming language. Its main focus lies on the application of reduced basis methods to parameterized partial differential equations. All algorithms in pyMOR are formulated in terms of abstract interfaces for seamless integration with external high-dimensional PDE solvers. Moreover, pure Python implementations of finite element and finite volume discretizations using the NumPy/SciPy scientific computing stack are provided for getting started quickly. For more information, visit http://pymor.org
 emgr: Empirical Gramian Framework. Empirical gramians can be computed for linear and nonlinear control systems for purposes of model order reduction, uncertainty quantification or system identification. The emgr framework is a compact open source toolbox for gramian-based model reduction and compatible with OCTAVE and MATLAB. More at: http://gramian.de
 KerMor: An object-oriented MATLAB© library providing routines for model order reduction of nonlinear dynamical systems. Reduction can be achieved via subspace projection and approximation of nonlinearities via kernels methods or DEIM. Standard procedures like the POD-Greedy method are readily implemented as well as advanced a-posteriori error estimators for various system configurations. KerMor also includes several working examples and some demo files to quickly get familiarized with the provided functionality. More information can be found at http://www.morepas.org/software/kermor/
 JaRMoS: JaRMoS stands for “Java Reduced Model Simulations” and aims to enable import and simulation of various reduced models from multiple sources on any java-capable platform. So far support for RBmatlab, KerMor and rbMIT reduced models is present, where we can only import the rbMIT models that have previously been published with the rbAppMIT Android application. Extensions so far are a desktop-version to run reduced models and initial support for KerMor kernel-based reduced models is on the way. More information can be found at http://www.morepas.org/software/jarmos/
 MORLAB: Model Order Reduction Laboratory. This toolbox is a collection of MATLAB/OCTAVE routines for model order reduction of linear dynamical systems based on the solution of matrix equations. The implementation is based on spectral projection methods, e.g., methods based on the matrix sign function and the matrix disk function. For more details on this software, see: https://www.mpi-magdeburg.mpg.de/projects/morlab
 Dune-RB: A module for the Dune library (www.dune-project.org, http://dune.mathematik.uni-freiburg.de), which realizes C++ template classes for use in snapshot generation and RB offline phases for various discretizations. Apart from single-core algorithms, the package also aims at using parallelization techniques for efficient snapshot generation. More at: http://users.dune-project.org/projects/dune-rb/wiki
 libROM: Collection of C++ classes that compute model order reduction and hyper-reduction  for systems of partial and ordinary differential equations. libROM includes scalable and parallel, adaptive methods for proper orthogonal decomposition, parallel, non-adaptive methods for hyper-reduction, and randomized singular value decomposition. libROM also includes the dynamic mode decomposition capability. libROM has physics-informed greedy sampling capability. Source codes can be found at: https://github.com/LLNL/libROM. Webpage can be found at: https://www.librom.net, where you can find many examples, e.g., reduced order models for Lagrangian hydrodynamics with shock-moving wave. 
 Pressio: Pressio is an open-source project aimed at alleviating the intrusive nature of projection-based reduced-order models for large-scale codes. The core of the project is a header-only C++ library that leverages generic programming to interface with shared or distributed memory applications using arbitrary data-types. Pressio provides numerous functionalities and solvers for performing model reduction, such as Galerkin and least-squares Petrov–Galerkin projections. The Pressio ecosystem also offers: (1) pressio4py, a Python binding library for ease of prototyping, (2) pressio-tutorials, a library also offering end-to-end demos that one can easily play with, which can be found at https://pressio.github.io/pressio-tutorials/, (3) pressio-tools, a library for large-scale SVD, QR and sample mesh, and (4) pressio-demoapps, a suite of 1d, 2d and 3d demo applications for testing ROMs and hyper-reduction. The ecosystem main website can be found at https://pressio.github.io/, the C++ library documentation at https://pressio.github.io/pressio/.

Applications 

Model order reduction finds application within all fields involving mathematical modelling and many reviews exist for the topics of electronics, fluid, hydrodynamics, structural mechanics, Boltzmann equation, and design optimization.

Fluid mechanics

Current problems in fluid mechanics involve large dynamical systems representing many effects on many different scales. The first usage of model order reduction techniques dates back to the work of Lumley in 1967, where it was used to gain insight into the mechanisms and intensity of turbulence and large coherent structures present in fluid flow problems. Model order reduction also finds modern applications in aeronautics to model the flow over the body of aircraft. An example can be found in Lieu et al in which the full order model of an F16 fighter-aircraft with over 2.1 million degrees of freedom, was reduced to a model of just 90 degrees of freedom. Additionally reduced order modeling has been applied to study rheology in hemodynamics and the fluid–structure interaction between the blood flowing through the vascular system and the vascular walls.

See also 

 Dimension reduction
 Metamodeling
 Principal component analysis
 Singular value decomposition
 Nonlinear dimensionality reduction
 System identification
 Iterative rational Krylov algorithm (IRKA)

References

Further reading

External links 
 Model Order Reduction Wiki
 Model Reduction for Parametrized Systems
 European Model Reduction Network

Numerical analysis
Mathematical modeling